Roseville Township is located in Warren County, Illinois, United States. As of the 2010 census, its population was 1,213 and it contained 578 housing units.

The village of Roseville is located in this township.

Geography

Demographics

References

External links
City-data.com
Illinois State Archives

Townships in Warren County, Illinois
Townships in Illinois